Whatcha Gonna Do may refer to:

 Whatcha Gonna Do? (Peter Green album) 1981
 Whatcha Gonna Do? (Jayo Felony album) 1998
 "Whatcha Gonna Do?" (song), a 1977 song by Pablo Cruise 
 "What'cha Gonna Do", a 1999 song by Eternal
 "Whatcha Gonna Do", a 1988 demo by Alice in Chains from Music Bank
 "Whatcha Gonna Do", a 1953 song by Bill Haley & His Comets, B-side to the single "Crazy Man, Crazy"
 "Whatcha Gonna Do", a song by  Billie from the 1998 release Honey to the B
 "Whatcha Gonna Do?", a demo by Bob Dylan from The Bootleg Series Vol. 9
 "Whatcha Gonna Do (When I'm Gone)", a song by Chilliwack from the 1982 release Opus X

See also 
 "Watcha Gon' Do?", a song by  Puff Daddy & The Family from the 1997 release No Way Out (Puff Daddy album)
 "What U Gon' Do", a 2004 song by Lil Jon & the Eastside Boyz from Crunk Juice
 "What You Gonna Do???", a 2020 song by  Bastille from Goosebumps
 "Whatcha Gonna Do About It", a 1965 song by Small Faces from their  self titled album
 "What'cha Gonna Do About It", a 1963 song by Doris Troy 
 "Bad Boys" (Inner Circle song), a 1987 song with the repeated lyrics "Watcha gonna do?"